The Markelfinger Winkel is the part of Lake Constance between the upper part of the Mettnau Peninsula and Markelfingen. It is the northwestern continuation of the Gnadensee and its parent lake, the Untersee ("Lower Lake Constance"). It has an area of around one square kilometre.

References 

Geography of Lake Constance